James Joseph Patterson (1923–1992) was an American newspaper executive who was part of an influential publishing  family.

Life
James J. Patterson was born in England in 1923 and raised in Ossining, New York. He was the only son of Joseph Medill Patterson, the founder of the New York Daily News, and his wife Mary King. She was the first female editor of the Chicago Tribune. He was the great-grandson of Joseph Medill, owner of the Chicago Tribune and mayor of Chicago. 

Patterson graduated from West Point in 1944. He served during World War II, achieving the rank of captain in the United States Army.

In April 1944 his engagement was announced to Dorothy Marie Clarke (born May 4, 1922). They had first met in a grade school run by St. Augustine Catholic Church in Ossining.
Her father was a prison guard at Sing Sing and he had 14 siblings.
They were married on June 10, 1944 in the Catholic Church. 

In 1949 Patterson joined the Daily News as a reporter in the Washington, DC bureau. After working for nearly a decade in various positions, he became vice president and assistant managing editor of the Daily News in 1958. The couple never had children. They divorced in 1968. He died on June 24, 1992 in Washington, DC. 

Patterson's nephew, Joseph Albright, son of his older half-sister Josephine Patterson Albright (1913–1996), married Madeleine Korbel, who had immigrated as a child with her family from Czechoslovakia after World War II. Her father was a diplomat in Europe, and she spoke several languages. She completed her higher education in the United States, graduating from Wellesley, and earning an MA and PhD at Columbia University. She later served as Secretary of State under President Bill Clinton. Patterson's older half-sister, Alicia Patterson (1906–1963), founded Newsday, a regional newspaper on Long Island.

In January 1968, Patterson married Barbara McMartin, a mathematician who completed her PhD in 1972. She also was an environmental activist and writer about the Adirondack Mountains and Park. The couple divorced in 1976.

His former wife Dorothy Clarke Patterson died September 30, 2007. In 2008 her estate made one of the ten largest charitable bequests of the year in the United States. The bequest to create the Patterson Foundation in Sarasota, Florida was estimated to be $225 million. Unlike many large donors, Patterson left few guidelines for the gift.

Family tree

References 

American newspaper editors
1923 births
1992 deaths
American male journalists
Medill-Patterson family
People from Ossining, New York
People from Longboat Key, Florida
United States Military Academy alumni
Military personnel from New York (state)
American expatriates in the United Kingdom